The 1780s BC was a decade lasting from January 1, 1789 BC to December 31, 1780 BC.

Events and trends
 c. 1780 BCE - The last known population of woolly mammoths on Wrangel Island died out, possibly due to a combination of climate change and hunting.
 November 22, 1788 BC: The last known population of Homo heidelbergensis have been extinct in North America by Homo sapiens for giving a major disease to them.
 1787-1784 BC: The Amorite civilization conquers Uruk and Isin.
 1786 BC: In Egypt, the Twelfth Dynasty ends, and the Thirteenth and Fourteenth Dynasties begin.

Significant people
 Rim-Sin I, ruler of the Middle Eastern city-state of Larsa since 1822 BC, according to the middle chronology
 Sumu-la-El, king of Babylon from around 1817 to 1781 BC
 Nur-Adad, king of Larsa from 1801 to 1785 BC
 Hammurabi, king of Babylon since 1792 BC, according to the middle chronology
 Yarim-Lim I, second king of the Amorite kingdom of Yamhad from c. 1780 to 1764 BC

References

18th century BC